Lake Mutanda is a small freshwater lake in Uganda.

Location
The coordinates of Lake Mutanda are:01 14 06S, 29 40 12E (Latitude:-1.2350; Longitude:29.6700).

Overview

The three volcanoes within the range, that are partly located in Uganda, namely: Mount Muhabura, Mount Sabinyo and Mount Gahinga, can be viewed from Lake Mutanda. There are several islands in the lake.
The lake is drained by the Rutshuru River, which flows northward to Lake Edward.

Flora and fauna
The environment on the islands within the lake and the surrounding countryside includes lakeside forests and wetland habitats that provide a haven for the endangered mountain gorilla.

In addition to the mountain gorilla and golden monkey in the nearby Mgahinga Gorilla National Park, the lakeside environment  accommodates a variety of animal and plant species, unique to this area. Bird species include kingfisher birds, kites, ibis and Uganda's national bird, the crested crane. Weaver bird nests are a common site among the reeds along the lake shore.

In addition to the abundant and varied avian species, the lake shore supports several species of snake, chameleon, monitor lizard and frog species. There is a varied and abundant supply of insect life as well. The mammals found in Lake Mutanda include the African clawless otter. Hippopotamus was also present in the area, but were last sighted at Lake Mutanda in 1994.

See also
 Kisoro
 Kisoro District
 Kigezi

References

External links
 Homestay on Lake Mutanda shores and Coffee Tours
 Nkuringo Safari Lodge on the Shores of Lake Mutanda
 Lake Mutanda Eco Community Centre
 Mgahinga Community Development Organization
 Bamboo Ecotours for Canoe Trekking at Lake Mutanda

Mutanda
Kisoro District
Nile basin